New Zealand sent a 13-member athlete delegation to the 1992 Summer Paralympics in Barcelona, winning 6 medals: 5 golds, 1 silver and 0 bronze medals.

Team 
New Zealand's team in Barcelona included 13 athletes.  The delegation included swimmer Jenny Newstead, Cristeen Smith, and team captain Dave MacCalman.  The 1992 Games were a transition period for New Zealand Paralympics, as the team went in looking to achieve personal bests.  A perception of underperformance at these Games led to changes for the 1996 Games, where the country used the lessons of 1992 to improve their performance.

Smith was quoted as saying of these Games, "We’re not ‘having a go,’ we’ve trained for years to get here. It's an achievement to get here to Barcelona."  MacCalman said of these Games, "In a general public area they see the wheelchair first so it’s up to you as a person to portray your personality forward and then the wheelchair is insignificant."

Medallists
The country won 6 medals at the 1992 Summer Paralympics: 5 golds, 1 silver and 0 bronze medals.

Swimming 
Jenny Newstead won four gold medals in the pool for New Zealand at the Barcelona Games.  She set several world records in the process.

See also
 New Zealand at the Paralympics

References

External links
 International Paralympic Committee
 Paralympics New Zealand

Nations at the 1992 Summer Paralympics
1992
Paralympics